CYCL may refer to:

 CYCL, the ICAO airport code for Charlo Airport in Canada
 CycL, an ontological knowledge-based programming language

See also 
 Cycle (disambiguation)